Robert Francis Murphy (March 3, 1924 – October 8, 1990) was an American anthropologist and professor of anthropology at Columbia University in New York City, from the early 1960s to 1990. His field work included studies of the Munduruku (Mundurucu) people of the Amazon and the Tuareg people of the Sahara.

Family, education, career
Murphy was a third generation descendant of Irish immigrants and grew up in Far Rockaway, Queens. His grandmother worked in a textile mill in New Hampshire, and his mother struggled to raise five young children with a mostly absent father in a "lace-curtain Irish" neighborhood of Queens; she suffered from breast cancer until she died when Bob was 14.

He enlisted in the United States Navy during World War II, serving as a private. He used the G.I. Bill to attend Columbia College as an undergraduate, graduating in 1949. Murphy went on to earn his Master of Arts and PhD in anthropology at Columbia University. He met his wife Yolanda in a physical anthropology course in graduate school, and they were married in St. Paul's Chapel at Columbia University.

In 1952 the Murphys set out to do fieldwork for a year among the Munduruku of the Amazon Rainforest in Brazil, where they studied, among other things, the dynamics of a patrilineal society with matrilocal residence patterns. Bob taught at the University of California, Berkeley for several years before taking a professorship at Columbia. In the early 1960s, Bob and Yolanda, with their two small children Robert and Pamela in tow, trekked to the Sahara to undertake a second fieldwork among the Tuareg of Niger, where Bob, who was fond of paradoxes, was able to study a matrilineal society with patrilocal residence patterns.

Murphy died of heart failure on October 8, 1990, at his home in Leonia, New Jersey. He was survived by his wife Yolanda and their two children.

Scholarly contributions to anthropology
A student of Julian Steward's cultural ecology approach in his early years, Murphy was an eclectic thinker who engaged Marx, Freud, Hegel, Simmel, and Schutz, and who incorporated ideas from diverse areas of anthropology theory — materialist, structuralist, and symbolic.  Murphy wrote numerous articles and books, including:
The Trumai Indians of Central Brazil (Monographs of the American Ethnological Society) (1955) (based upon field notes of Buell Quain)
Tappers and Trappers: Parallel Process in Acculturation (1956) Economic Development and Cultural Change 4.
Matrilocality and Patrilineality in Mundurucu Society. American Anthropologist (1956) Vol. 58 (3:3): 414–433
Mundurucu Religion (University of California Publications in American Archaeology and Ethnology) (1958)
The Structure of Parallel Cousin Marriage (1959)
Headhunter's Heritage: Social and Economic Change Among the Mundurucu Indians (1960)
Social Distance and the Veil (about Tuareg men's veiling practices) (1964)
The Dialectics of Social Life: Alarms and Excursions in Anthropological Theory (1971)
Robert H. Lowie (Leaders of Modern Anthropology) (1972)
Evolution and Ecology: Essays on Social Transformation (1978, co-authored with Julian H. Steward and Jane C. Steward)
American Anthropology, 1946–1970: Papers from the American Anthropologist (2002)
Women of the Forest (1974), co-authored with Yolanda (first author), now in a 30th anniversary edition (2004)

Margaret Mead called Women of the Forest "a salute to women's liberation in a portrait of a fascinating primitive people."

Disability
In 1974, Murphy was diagnosed as having a benign but slow-growing tumor of the spinal cord that would unrelentingly lead to impairment of his central nervous system and greater loss of bodily functions over the next 16 years of his life; within two years, by 1976, he was quadriplegic and used a wheelchair full-time. Murphy had the "rage to live", and began to edit his popular lectures on cultural anthropology for a new textbook, Overture to Social Anthropology (1979), later revised into second (1986) and third (1989) editions before he died. Murphy dramatically transformed his scholarly efforts into an anthropological study of paraplegia, a major project funded by the National Science Foundation, which he wrote about in his ethnography of "the damaged self", The Body Silent: The Different World of the Disabled (1987, 1990, 2001), which won the Columbia University Lionel Trilling Award.

Teaching style
Murphy was a charismatic and extraordinarily popular teacher among the students at Columbia.  His wry sense of humor and appreciation for irony caught the imaginations of thousands of Columbia undergraduates, and he regularly taught large auditorium-sized classes, even when his condition forced him to use a motorized wheelchair and speak through a microphone. Murphy won teaching awards and numerous academic awards, and was a Fellow of the John Simon Guggenheim Memorial Foundation in 1968.

Other publications

Murphy, Robert F.

1970 Basin Ethnography and Ecological Theory. In Language and Culture of Western North America: Essays in Honor of Sven S. Liljeblad, edited by Earl H. Swanson Jr., pp. 152–171. Pocatello: Idaho State University Press.
1977 Introduction: The Anthropological Theories of Julian H. Steward. In Evolution and Ecology: Essays on Social Transformation, edited by Jane Cannon Steward and R.F. Murphy, pp. 1–40. Urbana: University of Illinois Press.
1981 Julian Steward. In Totems and Teachers, edited by Sydel Silverman, pp. 171–204. New York: Columbia University Press.
1981 (Book Review) The Way of the Shaman: A Guide to Power and Healing by Michael Harner.  Review author[s]: Robert Murphy
American Anthropologist, New Series, Vol. 83, No. 3 (Sep. 1981), pp. 714–717
1986 Social Structure and Sex Antagonism. Journal of Anthropological Research 42 (1986), 407–416.
1987 American Anthropology. In Perspectives in Cultural Anthropology, edited by Herbert Applebaum. Albany: State University of New York Press.

Murphy, Robert, and Yolanda Murphy

1960 Shoshone-Bannock Subsistence and Society. University of California Anthropological Records. Berkeley: University of California Press, 16(7):293–338.
1986 Northern Shoshone and Bannock. In Handbook of North American Indians: 11. Great Basin, edited by Warren L. d'Azevedo, pp. 284–307. Washington, D.C.: Smithsonian Institution. Fried, Morton, Marvin Harris, and Robert Murphy, eds. 
1967 War: The Anthropology of Armed Conflict and Aggression. Garden City, New York: Natural History Press.

References

External links
 

1924 births
1990 deaths
American people of Irish descent
Columbia College (New York) alumni
Columbia Graduate School of Arts and Sciences alumni
Columbia University faculty
People from Far Rockaway, Queens
People from Leonia, New Jersey
20th-century American anthropologists
American military personnel of World War II
American expatriates in Brazil